The 10 cm Kanone 17 (10 cm K 17) was a field gun used by Germany in World War I and World War II.

Development
The range of the 10 cm K 14 was deemed insufficient in combat and Krupp designed a new, longer (L/45) barrel that was mounted on the K 14's carriage. This made the gun too heavy to be transported as a single load; the barrel had to be removed and stowed on its own transport wagon. The ramps visible in the picture (see right), served to guide the barrel transport wagon into position to align the barrel with the recoil system to allow it to be winched into battery. They are fixed in place on this example, but were generally removable.

The K 17 used either a hydro-pneumatic or hydro spring recoil system, presumably depending on manufacturer.

Anti-aircraft role
Despite the recognition that the K 17 would not have any anti-aircraft role, most of the heavy and expensive features added to the K 14 in a failed bid to equip it as an AA gun were retained. Presumably this was to hasten the switchover from production of the K 14 to the K 17. A simpler version of the K 17 was designed in 1917 that harkened back to the K 04 in many ways. The complex sighting system was dropped in favor of one based on the sights used on the 15 cm sFH 13, variable recoil was deleted and the gun could not be broken down for transport. This was called the K 17/04; about a thousand were ordered in August 1917.

Counter battery gun
Because of its perceived value as an anti-aircraft weapon, the gun was a difficult piece to manufacture. Despite a few K 04s shooting down balloons during the war, these weapons never fulfilled a useful air defense niche. In 1914, few active army corps had heavy guns within their organization. These pieces were often found in reserve units. By 1918, all corps incorporated heavy guns. A Foot Artillery Battalion was typically organized with two howitzer batteries and one heavy gun battery. Overall it appears that the 10 cm guns did find useful service. They served as an excellent long-range counter battery weapon and were more than passable as an anti-personnel weapon. They were well paired with the 15 cm guns, which more commonly served in the anti-personnel role.

Fate
Germany was forbidden to use these guns by the Versailles Treaty and was supposed to scrap or sell all existing weapons. Some were sold to Sweden and Romania after the war, but some were hidden and saw service in World War II, mainly in the coastal defense role. Here the Kanone 1917 and K 17/04 soldiered on along with the 10 cm Kanone 1918, these three most modern types saw excellent service throughout World War II.

External links
K 17 on Lovett Artillery Collection
Development of the 10 cm Kanone on Lovett Artillery Collection
List and pictures of World War I surviving 10cm K 17 guns

References 

 Engelmann, Joachim and Scheibert, Horst. Deutsche Artillerie 1934–1945: Eine Dokumentation in Text, Skizzen und Bildern: Ausrüstung, Gliederung, Ausbildung, Führung, Einsatz. Limburg/Lahn, Germany: C. A. Starke, 1974
 Gander, Terry and Chamberlain, Peter. Weapons of the Third Reich: An Encyclopedic Survey of All Small Arms, Artillery and Special Weapons of the German Land Forces 1939–1945. New York: Doubleday, 1979 
 Hogg, Ian V. German Artillery of World War Two. 2nd corrected edition. Mechanicsville, PA: Stackpole Books, 1997 
 Jäger, Herbert. German Artillery of World War One. Ramsbury, Marlborough, Wiltshire: Crowood Press, 2001 

World War I artillery of Germany
World War II field artillery
World War II artillery of Germany
105 mm artillery